Jerry Booth was an English footballer who played as a winger. He played one match in the Football League for Burnley in 1903.

References

Year of birth unknown
Year of death unknown
English footballers
Association football defenders
Burnley F.C. players
English Football League players